Michael Fritsch is professor of Economics and Chair of Business Dynamics, Innovation, and Economic Change at the Friedrich Schiller University Jena, Germany. He is also an Associate Editor of the academic journals Regional Studies and Small Business Economics.

Career 

Michael Fritsch studied economics at the Technical University of Berlin and finished his exam as Diplom-Volkswirt (Master of Economics) in 1977. He was a research associate and a senior research fellow at the Institute of Economics of the Technical University of Berlin where he finished his Ph.D. (Dr. rer. oec.) in 1982 and received his Habilitation for Economics in 1989.
From 1990 to 1992 Michael Fritsch acted as Interim Chair of Economic Policy at the Technical University of Berlin. In 1992 he became Full Professor of Economics and Chair of Economic Policy at the School of Economics and Business Administration of the Technical University Bergakademie of Freiberg. Since 2006 Prof. Fritsch has been Chair of Business Dynamics, Innovation, and Economic Change at the School of Economics and Business Administration of Friedrich Schiller University of Jena.

Research 

The main fields of research of Michael Fritsch are entrepreneurship and innovation. His research on entrepreneurship has focused on the determinants of new business formation and on the effect of new businesses on economic development. In the field of innovation he has analyzed cooperative relationships and the division of innovative labor. A particular interest was on the role of universities in regional innovation systems.
Further research of Michael Fritsch deals with the contribution of creativity, particularly artistic activity, to economic development. He has also worked on the efficiency of markets and the causes for market failure.
Recent research by Michael Fritsch is focussing on the role of knowledge, entrepreneurship, and cultural factors in long-term regional development trajectories.

Publications 
Michael Fritsch is the author of more than 17 books and comprehensive studies. He has published more than 130 articles in scholarly journals and  has made more than 140 contributions to edited volumes. He was an editor of more than 25 books and special issues of academic journals. His textbook „Marktversagen und Wirtschaftspolitik – Mikroökonomische Grundlagen staatlichen Handelns“ (‚Market Failure and Economic Policy – Microeconomic Foundations of Economic Policy‘) is currently available.

Books (selection):
 The Geography of Entrepreneurial Psychology. Cheltenham 2021: Elgar (with Martin Obschonka and Michael Stuetzer). https://doi.org/10.4337/9781788973380 
 Regional Trajectories of Entrepreneurship, Knowledge, and Growth - The Role of History and Culture. Cham 2019: Springer (with Michael Wyrwich). https://link.springer.com/book/10.1007%2F978-3-319-97782-9
 Entrepreneurship – Theorie, Empirie, Politik (‚Entrepreneurship – Theory, Empirics, Policy‘). third revised edition, Berlin/Heidelberg 2022: Springer (in German, Textbook) (with Michael Wyrwich). https://doi.org/10.1007/978-3-662-45394-0
 Marktversagen und Wirtschaftspolitik: Mikroökonomische Grundlagen staatlichen Handelns (‘Mikroökonomische Grundlagen staatlichen Handelns“ (‚Market Failure and Economic Policy – Microeconomic Foundations of Economic Policy‘). 10th revised and complemented edition, Munich 2018: Franz Vahlen (in German, Textbook). https://doi.org/10.15358/9783800656448 
 Hochschulen, Innovation, Region - Wissenstransfer im räumlichen Kontext (‚Universities, Innovation, Region – Knowledge Transfer in Spatial Context‘). Berlin 2007: edition sigma  (with Tobias Henning, Viktor Slavtchev and Norbert Steigenberger, in German).
 Arbeitsplatzentwicklung in Industriebetrieben - Entwurf einer Theorie der Arbeitsplatzdynamik und empirische Analysen auf einzelwirtschaftlicher Ebene (‚Employment Dynamics in Manufacturing Establishments – Outline of a Theory and Empirical Analyses at the Micro-Level‘). Berlin/New York 1990: de Gruyter (Habilitation thesis, in German).
 Ökonomische Ansätze zur Legitimation kollektiven Handelns (‚Economic Approaches to Legitimize Collective Action‘). Berlin 1983: Duncker & Humblot 1983 (PhD. Dissertation, in German).

Journal articles (selection):
 Is innovation (increasingly) concentrated in large cities? An international comparison. Research Policy, 50 (2021), 104237 (with Michael Wyrwich). https://doi.org/10.1016/j.respol.2021.104237
 Self-Employment and Well-Being across Institutional Contexts. Journal of Business Venturing, 34 (2019), 105946 (with Alina Sorgner and Michael Wyrwich). https://doi.org/10.1016/j.jbusvent.2019.105946
 The Effect of Entrepreneurship for Economic Development—An empirical analysis using regional entrepreneurship culture. Journal of Economic Geography, 17 (2017), 157-189 (with Michael Wyrwich). https://doi.org/10.1093/jeg/lbv049
 The Long Persistence of Regional Levels of Entrepreneurship: Germany 1925 to 2005. Regional Studies, 48 (2014), 955-973 (with Michael Wyrwich). https://doi.org/10.1080/00343404.2013.816414
 Entrepreneurship in a Regional Context – Historical Roots and Recent Developments. Regional Studies, 48 (2014), 939-954 (with David Storey). https://doi.org/10.1080/00343404.2014.892574 
 The Phantom of the Opera: Cultural Amenities, Human Capital, and Regional Economic Growth. Labour Economics, 18 (2011), 755-766 (with Oliver Falck and Stephan Heblich). https://doi.org/10.1016/j.labeco.2011.06.004
 Innovation, regional knowledge spillovers and R&D cooperation. Research Policy, 33 (2004), 245-255 (with Grit Franke). https://doi.org/10.1016/S0048-7333(03)00123-9 
 Effects of new business formation on regional development over time. Regional Studies,  38 (2004), 961-975 (with Pamela Mueller). https://doi.org/10.1080/0034340042000280965
 Who cooperates on R&D? Research Policy, 30 (2001), 297-312 (with Rolf Lukas). 

Edited books and special issues of academic journals (selection):
 Ökonomische Geographie (Economic Geography). 2nd completely revised edition, Munich 2020: Vahlen(with Johannes Broecker, in German, Textbook).
 Special Issue "Evolution and Co-evolution of Regional Innovation Processes”. Regional Studies, 53 (2019), no. 9 (with Muhamed Kudic and Andreas Pyka).
 Schrumpfende Regionen – dynamische Hochschulen. Hochschulstrategien im demografischen Wandel. Wiesbaden 2015: Springer VS (with Peer Pasternack und Mirko Titze, in German).
 Special Issue “Entrepreneurship in a Regional Context”, Regional Studies, Vol. 48 (2014), No. 6 (with David J. Storey).
 Handbook of Research on Entrepreneurship and Regional Development: National and Regional Perspectives. Cheltenham 2011: Elgar Publishing.
 Special Issue “The Effects of New Businesses on Economic Development”, Small Business Economics, Vol. 30 (2008), No. 1.
 Entrepreneurship in the region, New York 2006: Springer (with Jürgen Schmude).
 Special Issue “Regionalization of Innovation Policy”, Research Policy, Vol. 34 (2005), No. 8 (with Andreas Stephan).

For the complete list of publications see the personal website of Michael Fritsch https://m-fritsch.de/publications/

References

External links
 Personal Homepage Michael Fritsch www.m-fritsch.de
 Homepage of Michael Fritsch at Friedrich Schiller University Jena 
 Friedrich Schiller University Jena 

Living people
German economists
Regional economists
People from Freiberg
Year of birth missing (living people)